Región Valles is the eleventh administrative region of the Mexican state of Jalisco. Its seat is the city of Ameca. The region is composed of 14 municipalities.

The region's agricultural crops include maize, chickpea, sugar cane, agave, wheat, and sorghum. Fishing is only for regional supply. Minerals mined in the area are gold, silver, kaolin, quartz, feldspar, baryta, zinc, copper, lead, opal, and fluorite.

Municipalities

References

Geography of Jalisco